Andrea Lorenzo Scartazzini (born 1971) is a Swiss composer whose operas have been performed at leading European opera houses.

Career 
Born in Basel, he studied there German studies and Italian studies. He changed to studying composition with Rudolf Kelterborn at the Musikhochschule Basel, which he continued with Wolfgang Rihm in Karlsruhe. In 1999/2000, he studied one semester at the Royal Academy of Music.

He has worked as a composer, and in the beginning also as a music teacher. His works have been performed at major festivals such as the Salzburg Easter Festival, Lucerne Festival and Darmstädter Ferienkurse. He composed in 2008 Siegel for the Basel Sinfonietta, who premiered it with Claudia Barainsky, conducted by Peter Hirsch. The ensemble premiered in 2012 his Viaggiatori, composed for the centenary of the Basler Bach-Chor.

He was in 2004/05 composer in residence at the Witten/Herdecke University. In 2006, his opera  premiered at the Theater Erfurt. A CD with songs was published by the label Guild Music. In 2012, his opera Der Sandmann on a libretto by  premiered at the Theater Basel which had commissioned the opera, staged by Christof Loy. The production was shown at the Frankfurt Opera in 2016, as the first in Germany. His opera Edward II. premiered in February 2017 at the Deutsche Oper Berlin, conducted by Thomas Søndergård and staged again by Loy.

Works (selection)
2006: , opera
2008: Siegel for soprano and orchestra
2011: Viaggiatori for soloists, choir and orchestra
2016: Der Sandmann, opera
2017: Edward II, opera

References

External links 
 
 
 
 
 Andrea Lorenzo Scartazzini / Der Sandmann – Oper in 10 Szenen musiques-suisses.ch
Sound recordings of works of the composer from the archives of SRG SSR on Neo.Mx3

Swiss classical composers
Swiss opera composers
Swiss male composers
1971 births
Living people